Microdiplatys oculatus is an extinct species of earwig in the family Protodiplatyidae. It is one of only two species in the genus Microdiplatys, the other being Microdiplatys campodeiformis.

References

External links
 The Tree of Life's article on Archidermaptera

Archidermaptera